Anthony Peter Bishop, CB, QHC, FRSA (born 24 May 1946) is a British Anglican priest and retired military chaplain. From 1998 to 2001, he served as Chaplain-in-Chief, and thereby head of the Royal Air Force Chaplains Branch, and Archdeacon for the Royal Air Force.

Bishop was a civil servant in the Ministry of Transport from 1963 to 1967. After studying at the London College of Divinity and St John's College, Nottingham he was ordained deacon in 1971, and priest in 1972. After a curacy in Beckenham he served with the RAF from 1975 to 2001. He was appointed an Honorary Chaplain to the Queen in 1998.

References

Church of England priests
20th-century English Anglican priests
21st-century English Anglican priests
Royal Air Force Chaplains-in-Chief
Alumni of the London College of Divinity
Alumni of St John's College, Nottingham
Honorary Chaplains to the Queen
Companions of the Order of the Bath
1946 births
Living people